Nammavar is a 1994 Indian Tamil-language drama film directed by K. S. Sethumadhavan and produced by B. Venkatarama Reddy. The film stars Kamal Haasan and Gautami, while Nagesh, Senthil, Kovai Sarala, Srividya and Karan play supporting roles. It follows a history lecturer of a college and how he tries to reform the downtrodden college by his initiatives and its consequences.

The story and screenplay were written by Haasan, and the dialogues by Kanmani Subbu. The music was composed by debutant Mahesh Mahadevan with cinematography by Madhu Ambat, and editing by N. P. Satish. The film was inspired by various English-language films about universities and professors including To Sir, with Love (1967), Class of 1984 (1982) and The Principal (1987).

Nammavar was released on 2 November 1994, Diwali day. It won three National Film Awards: Best Feature Film in Tamil, Best Supporting Actor (Nagesh), and Special Mention (Mahesh); and two Tamil Nadu State Film Awards: Second Best Film and Special Prize (Nagesh).

Plot 
V. C. Selvam, a history professor, is appointed as the vice principal of Sakthivel Arts College, which is riddled with students' unrest and conflicts. Ramesh, son of a major donor to the college, is a spoiled brat and campus bully who influences other students by his vulgar display of money and power. Sparks fly between Selvam, who tries to bring in some order in the college, and Ramesh, who tries to spoil it from their first interaction.

Selvam brings in changes. Students join together to paint the campus and bring in a clean look, introduces discipline in reporting time for professors and students, closes the canteen during lectures and opens a cultural centre for students. By adopting a different teaching technique, Selvam helps students to gain more focus.

Vasanthi, a professor in the same college, initially disapproves of Selvam's methods, but finally finds them beneficial for the students and falls in love with him despite his initial resistance. Ramesh becomes displeased with the changes and is vexed at losing control over the students who are moving to Selvam's side.

Ramesh tries to provoke Selvam, who does not respond. Ramesh injures himself and frames Selvam, which instigates the students to call for a strike. Despite many students supporting him, Selvam apologises for the sake of peace in the college. When Ramesh tries to derail the students' plan of participating in an inter-college cultural competition by destroying their musical instruments, Selvam uses the students' skills to create a cappella music and wins the competition.

After a student is hospitalised and needs blood urgently, Selvam chooses not to donate his blood, instead organising a donor. Vasanthi is disappointed at Selvam's decision and learns through his aide Perumal that Selvam has blood cancer; his days are numbered. Shocked, she resolves to marry Selvam soon. Though Selvam does not initially reciprocate, she manages to convince him. She also learns of Selvam's desire to seek answers to fight his inner demons by doing good to the college.

Ramesh is suspended from college for drug dealing. He kidnaps his former friend Vijay's (who started supporting Selvam) girlfriend Nirmala, daughter of professor Prabhakar Rao, and implicates her in a brothel case, leading to her arrest. Though Selvam bails Nirmala out, she commits suicide out of disgrace. This provokes Vijay into trying to kill Ramesh.

During the fight against Ramesh, Vijay is stabbed and Selvam comes to his rescue. Selvam is also stabbed, and people start throwing stones at Ramesh, but Selvam rescues him. Ramesh soon realises he is alone in the conflict; everyone in the college has deserted him. Selvam asks the students to forgive Ramesh and give him a second chance, which makes Ramesh repentant. Afterwards, Selvam and Vasanthi decide to leave to the United States seeking a cure for the cancer, hopeful that the college will be truly reformed when they return.

Cast 
Kamal Haasan as V. C. Selvam
Gautami as Vasanthi
Nagesh as Prabhakar Rao
Senthil as Perumal
Kovai Sarala as Julie
Srividya as Selvam's sister
Karan as Ramesh
Delhi Ganesh as Muthukumaraswamy Pillai
Madhan Bob as the Tamil lecturer Naidu
K. Vishnu as Muthukumaraswamy Pillai's son
Brinda as Nirmala

The uncredited cast includes Ramji as Ramesh's friend Vijay, Santhana Bharathi as Sakthivel, and Sethu Vinayagam as Ramesh's father.

Production

Development 
Nammavar was directed by K. S. Sethumadhavan and produced by B. Venkatarama Reddy under Chandamama Vijaya Combines. While the story and screenplay were written by Kamal Haasan (who also played the lead role of Selvam), the dialogues were written by Kanmani Subbu. The film's title was chosen by Ananthu. Cinematography was handled by Madhu Ambat, editing by N. P. Satish, and art direction by B. Chalam. The film was inspired by various English-language films about universities and professors including To Sir, with Love (1967), Class of 1984 (1982), and The Principal (1987). It was the final Tamil film directed by Sethumadhavan.

Casting 
Gautami was Sethumadhavan and Haasan's first choice for playing Vasanthi, and got the role. Though Nagesh, primarily a comedian, was initially hesitant to accept the role of Prabhakar Rao, he was nonetheless cast as Haasan was adamant on him acting in the film. Brinda was chosen to portray Rao's daughter Nirmala, and Nammavar was the only film she ever acted in. According to Sethumadhavan, casting Brinda was Haasan's idea. Abhishek Shankar, who later gained fame for the TV series Kolangal, was initially approached to play the antagonist Ramesh, but could not accept the offer as he was committed to another film; the role went to Karan, upon Haasan's recommendation. Vijay Sethupathi, then aged 16, had auditioned for a role, but was rejected because of his then short height, lean physique and inability to grow facial hair.

Filming 
Principal photography began on 20 May 1994. The first day shoot was at held at Vijaya Vauhini Studios, with Karan and Haasan in a classroom scenario. The scene where Rao reacts to his daughter's death was filmed in one take, and Sethumadhavan chose not to say "cut" at the time. For a scene, the crew initially planned to shoot in Ooty; however they finally shot that scene by building a set resembling Ooty in Taramani and Vijaya Studios.

Soundtrack 
The soundtrack was composed by Mahesh Mahadevan, while the lyrics were written by Pulamaipithan and Vairamuthu. It was released under the label Music Master. Nammavar is the feature film debut for Mahesh, who previously composed advertising jingles. The song "Sorgam Enbathu Namakku" marked the debut of playback singer Srinivas.

Release 
Nammavar was released on 2 November 1994, Diwali day despite initial plans to release on Pongal. Made on a budget of 3.7 crore, the film grossed 9.75 crore. It was later dubbed in Telugu as Professor Viswam.

Reception 
Malini Mannath of The Indian Express wrote on 11 November, "The filmmaker tries to be little different, at times moving away from cliches and conclusions. But he couldn't entirely do without them either." On 14 November, K. Vijiyan of New Straits Times wrote, "With its realistic dialogue and quiet humour, Nammavar looks like a winner for Kamalhassan." Balaji T.K. of INDOlink wrote "Kamal's taut and flawless Screenplay handled with aplomb by Sethumadhavan separates Nammavar from the run on the mill stuff churned out in the name of Tamil cinema from the mills in Kodambakkam. The story is nothing new, and is similar to Thalaivasal [...] but the manner in which its been handled makes this one of the most enjoyable movie going experiences in recent times, with the right measure of drama, action, pathos and humor supported by excellent acting and pleasing background music and good cinematography". Thulasi of Kalki appreciated the film for various aspects, including Sethumadhavan's direction, the cast performances and the music. On 27 November, Ananda Vikatan wrote, "Overall, with superb dialogues, beautiful camera work, impressive background score and Kamal's interesting acting enable the film to score".

Accolades

Legacy 
Following the film's release, "Nammavar" became a popular nickname for Haasan among his fans. Karan's performance was considered his tour-de-force by critics, and he regards the film as a breakthrough in his career. Film historian S. Theodore Baskaran felt that Oru Thalai Ragam (1980) and Nammavar were the "two most representative Tamil films about students". In the 2021 film Master, JD (Vijay) is referred to as the student of Professor Selvam, who he considers as his inspiration and becomes alcoholic after his death.

References

Bibliography

External links 
 

1990s Tamil-language films
1994 drama films
1994 films
Best Tamil Feature Film National Film Award winners
Films about educators
Films directed by K. S. Sethumadhavan
Films featuring a Best Supporting Actor National Film Award-winning performance
Films set in universities and colleges
Indian drama films
Indian films about cancer